The Kampung Selamat station is a mass rapid transit (MRT) station serving the areas of Kampung Selamat and Kampung Baru Sungai Buloh in Sungai Buloh, Selangor, Malaysia. The station was one of the stations on the MRT Kajang Line and was opened on 16 December 2016 under Phase One operations of the line.

The station name is taken from the nearby Kampung Selamat (English: Safe Village) which lies on the east side of Jalan Sungai Buloh.

Although it was previously a station as part of the MRT Kajang Line, the station is one of three which were transferred over to the MRT Putrajaya Line and began operations on 16 June 2022.

Station features

Station location
The station is an elevated station located on the east side of Jalan Sungai Buloh. The design of the station is the standard elevated station design comprising two levels above the ground level. The first level is the concourse level, the two side platforms flanking the double tracks above.

The station features a long pedestrian bridge over Jalan Sungai Buloh and Jalan Welfare, linking the stations to its two entrances as well as the future link bridges directly into the SqWhere and D'sara Sentral developments.

Station layout

Exits and entrances
The station has three entrances, with Entrance A on the same side of Jalan Sungai Buloh as the station, and Entrances B and C as well as the link bridges to the SqWhere SOVO, a mixed development project by Selangor Dredging Berhad which is currently can be used for public use, and D'sara Sentral developments, a completed mixed development project by the Mah Sing Group, on the other side of Jalan Sungai Buloh from the station and linked via a long pedestrian bridge.

Connection

Feeder Bus Services

With the opening of the Kajang Line in 2016 and reopening as Putrajaya Line in 2022, feeder buses also began operating linking the station with Kampung Baru Sungai Buloh. The feeder buses operate from the station's feeder bus hub accessed via Entrance B across Jalan Sungai Buloh from the station via a pedestrian bridge.

Nearby
 Bright Sparklers disaster memorial

References

External links
 Kampung Selamat MRT station - MRT Website
 Klang Valley Mass Rapid Transit

Rapid transit stations in Selangor
Railway stations opened in 2016
Sungai Buloh-Kajang Line